Knight Peak is a 2,235-meter-elevation (7,333-foot) mountain summit located in the Cheam Range of British Columbia, Canada.

Description
Knight Peak is more notable for its steep rise above local terrain than for its absolute elevation. Precipitation runoff from this mountain drains south to the Chilliwack River via Airplane and Foley creeks, and north to the Fraser River via Wahleach Lake and Wahleach Creek. The nearest higher neighbor is Baby Munday Peak,  to the east.

History

The first ascent of the summit was made in September 1892 by Ebe B. Knight and David Walker. Don Serl and Bruce Kay first climbed the northwest face in April 1987.

The peak was likely named after Ebe R. Knight who made the first ascent and was a leading spirit in various ascents in this area during 1888–1892. He also made first ascents of Cheam Peak, Stewart Peak and Lady Peak. The toponym was officially adopted May 30, 1946, by the Geographical Names Board of Canada.

Climate

Knight Peak is located in the marine west coast climate zone of western North America. Most weather fronts originate in the Pacific Ocean, and travel northeast toward the Cascade Mountains. As fronts approach the North Cascades, they are forced upward by the peaks (Orographic lift), causing them to drop their moisture in the form of rain or snowfall onto the Cascades. As a result, the west side of the North Cascades experiences high precipitation, especially during the winter months in the form of snowfall. Because of maritime influence, snow tends to be wet and heavy, resulting in high avalanche danger. Temperatures in winter can drop below −20 °C with wind chill factors below −30 °C. This climate supports a small glacier in the cirque northeast of the peak. During winter months, weather is usually cloudy, but due to high pressure systems over the Pacific Ocean that intensify during summer months, there is often little or no cloud cover during the summer. The months July through September offer the most favorable weather for viewing or climbing this peak.

Geology
The North Cascades feature some of the most rugged topography in the Cascade Range with craggy peaks, ridges, and deep glacial valleys. Geological events occurring many years ago created the diverse topography and drastic elevation changes over the Cascade Range leading to various climate differences.

The history of the formation of the Cascade Mountains dates back millions of years ago to the late Eocene Epoch. With the North American Plate overriding the Pacific Plate, episodes of volcanic igneous activity persisted. In addition, small fragments of the oceanic and continental lithosphere called terranes created the North Cascades about 50 million years ago.

During the Pleistocene period dating back over two million years ago, glaciation advancing and retreating repeatedly scoured the landscape leaving deposits of rock debris. The U-shaped cross section of the river valleys is a result of recent glaciation. Uplift and faulting in combination with glaciation have been the dominant processes which have created the tall peaks and deep valleys of the North Cascades area.

See also

 Geography of the North Cascades

Gallery

References

External links
 Knight Peak: Weather Forecast
 Northwest Face (photo): Flickr

Two-thousanders of British Columbia
North Cascades
Yale Division Yale Land District
Cascade Range